Marion is the surname of:

Anne Windfohr Marion (1938–2020), American rancher and business executive
Brock Marion (born 1970), American retired National Football League player
Don Marion Davis (1917–2020), American child actor
Francis Marion  (c. 1732–1795), army officer during the American Revolutionary War, known as the Swamp Fox
Jean-Luc Marion (born 1946), French historian of philosophy, phenomenologist and Roman Catholic theologian
Jerry Marion (born 1944), American National Football League player
John L. Marion, American auctioneer, philanthropist and Chairman of Sotheby's from 1975 to 1994
J. Paul Marion (born 1927), Canadian politician
Marty Marion (1917–2011), American Major League Baseball player and manager
Paul Marion (actor) (1915–2011), American actor
Paul Marion (politician) (1899–1954), French journalist and Vichy French Minister of Information
Pierre Marion (1921–2010), French secret service chief 
Shawn Marion (born 1978), American former National Basketball Association player